The A6 is an arterial road linking Cumberland Highway at  and Princes Highway at , via Lidcombe and Bankstown. It was formerly designated as Metroad 6, which was one of the Sydney Metroads.

The A6 provides a link from the northern suburbs to the southern suburbs, and from the Pacific Highway to the Princes Highway. Some stretches such as Silverwater Road, Alfords Point Road, New Illawarra Road and Heathcote Road have very few junctions or are in (currently) rural areas, and the speed limit is therefore relaxed slightly.

The A6 includes two major bridges - the Silverwater Bridge over the Parramatta River, and the Alfords Point Bridge over the Georges River.

Roads
Route "A6" consists of all or part of the following roads:
 Marsden Road
 Stewart Street
 Kissing Point Road
 Silverwater Road
 St. Hilliers Road
 Boorea Street
 Olympic Drive
 Joseph Street
 Rookwood Road
 Stacey Street
 Fairford Road
 Davies Road
 Alfords Point Road
 New Illawarra Road
 Heathcote Road

History
The passing of the Main Roads Act of 1924 through the Parliament of New South Wales provided for the declaration of Main Roads, roads partially funded by the State government through the Main Roads Board (later the Department of Main Roads, and eventually Transport for NSW). Main Road no. 158 was declared from Kissing Point Road in Ermington along Marsden Road to the intersection with Pennant Hills Road in Carlingford, and Main Road No. 190 was declared from the intersection with Great Western Highway in Lidcombe, via John Street, Church Street, Railway Parade, East Street, Victoria Street and Rookwood Road to the intersection with Hume Highway at Bankstown, on the same day, 8 August 1928.

The Department of Main Roads constructed a number of defense routes during World War II, including Heathcote Road and a new road (called New Illawarra Road) between Lucas Heights and Heathcote Road, bypassing the causeway crossing of the Woronora River at The Needles; these projects were completed during 1941.

The Olympic Drive project into Lidcombe under the railway lines to connect to Bridge Street was completed in 1955, with the route realigned along it to reach Great Western Highway via St Hilliers Road instead. It was extended further north along Silverwater Road from Lidcombe via Silverwater to Ermington when the Silverwater Bridge over the Parramatta River was completed in 1962. A new bridge over the railway line east of Bankstown connecting both halves of Stacey Street was completed in 1970, and the completion of Alfords Point Bridge over the Georges River in 1973 extended the route further south from Padstow to Lucas Heights.

State Route 45 underwent further realignments. The Lidcombe bypass, connecting a new alignment from Victoria Street to Olympic Drive where it met at Bridge Street, opened in 1982 and State Route 45 was rerouted onto the bypass. In 1996, the Silverwater Road extension from Ermington to Dundas opened and State Route 45 was extended along Stewart Street and Marsden Road to Pennant Hills Road (Cumberland Highway). In 1999 Stacey Street was extended north to directly connect with Rookwood Road, obviating the need for State Route 45 traffic to use the Hume Highway between these two roads.

State Route 45 was replaced by Metroad 6 in January 1999. The northern terminus of Metroad 6 was the Marsden Rd/Pennant Hills Road intersection in Carlingford. When the then Metroad 7 was reassigned from Cumberland Highway to the Westlink M7 motorway when it was opened in December 2005, Metroad 6 was extended northwards to the M2 Hills Motorway.

Metroad 6 was realigned between Menai and Barden Ridge, from Old Illawarra Road onto New Illawarra Road, which was completed between 2005 and 2011 as part of the Bangor Bypass project.

With the conversion to the newer alphanumeric system in 2013, Metroad 6 was replaced with route A6, with the Pennant Hills Road section of Metroad 6 redesignated as part of route A28.

Future
In 2019, the New South Wales Government announced it would rename the northern extension of the Princes Motorway, between Arncliffe and Kogarah (due to open in 2025) to the "M6 Motorway". No announcement has yet been made on whether the A6 will be renumbered to avoid duplicate numbers.

See also

References 

Sydney Metroads